Nemanja Petrić (born 28 July 1987) is a Serbian professional volleyball player. He is part of the Serbia national team. The 2019 European Champion. At the professional club level, he plays for the Italian team, Emma Villas Volley.

Career

National team
Petrić was in the junior and youth national teams of Serbia, and in 2009 he made his debut in the senior squad. It happened over the first weekend in the Intercontinental Round of the 2009 World League against France.
On July 19, 2015 Serbian national team with him in squad went to the final of World League, but they lost with United States 0–3 and achieved silver medal.

Honours

Clubs
 CEV Challenge Cup
  2018/2019 – with Belogorie Belgorod

 National championships
 2007/2008  Montenegrin Cup, with Budućnost Podgorica
 2007/2008  Montenegrin Championship, with Budućnost Podgorica
 2008/2009  Montenegrin Cup, with Budućnost Podgorica
 2014/2015  Italian Cup, with Parmareggio Modena
 2015/2016  Italian SuperCup, with DHL Modena
 2015/2016  Italian Cup, with DHL Modena
 2015/2016  Italian Championship, with DHL Modena
 2016/2017  Italian SuperCup, with Azimut Modena
 2017/2018  Turkish Cup, with Halkbank Ankara
 2017/2018  Turkish Championship, with Halkbank Ankara

References

External links

 
 Player profile at LegaVolley.it 
 Player profile at Volleybox.net 

Living people
1987 births
People from Prijepolje
Serbian men's volleyball players
European champions for Serbia
Serbian expatriate sportspeople in Montenegro
Expatriate volleyball players in Montenegro
Serbian expatriate sportspeople in Belgium
Expatriate volleyball players in Belgium
Serbian expatriate sportspeople in Italy
Expatriate volleyball players in Italy
Serbian expatriate sportspeople in Turkey
Expatriate volleyball players in Turkey
Serbian expatriate sportspeople in Russia
Expatriate volleyball players in Russia
Modena Volley players
Halkbank volleyball players
Power Volley Milano players
Outside hitters